"Disconnect" is a song by Rollins Band. It is the second single released in support of their fourth album Weight.

Formats and track listing 
All songs written by Sim Cain, Melvin Gibbs, Chris Haskett and Henry Rollins
US 7" single
"Disconnect" – 4:31
"Disconnect" (Edit) – 4:57

US CS single (72787-25084)
"Disconnect" (Edit) – 4:32
"Miles Jam" – 6:15

US CD single (72787-25078)
"Disconnect" (Edit) – 4:31
"Plague" – 4:29
"Miles Jam" – 6:15

Australian CD single (72787250892)
"Disconnect" – 4:32
"Right Here Too Much" – 4:41
"Night Sweat" – 5:15
"Night Sweat" – 4:29
"Plague" – 6:15

Charts

Release history

References

External links 
 

Rollins Band songs
1994 singles
1994 songs
Imago Records singles